K147 or K-147 may refer to:

K-147 (Kansas highway), a state highway in Kansas 
HMCS Baddeck (K147)